Jacky Donkor (born 12 November 1998) is a Belgian professional footballer who plays as a midfielder for Dutch club Excelsior.

Club career
On 24 August 2021, Donkor joined Dordrecht.

On 21 July 2022, Donkor signed a three-year contract with Excelsior.

Personal life
Born in Belgium, Donkor is of Ghanaian descent.

References

External links
 Career stats & Profile - Voetbal International

1998 births
Living people
Belgian people of Ghanaian descent
Belgian footballers
Footballers from Ghent
Association football midfielders
Eredivisie players
Eerste Divisie players
K.A.A. Gent players
R.S.C. Anderlecht players
West Bromwich Albion F.C. players
K.S.C. Lokeren Oost-Vlaanderen players
Fortuna Sittard players
FC Eindhoven players
FC Dordrecht players
Excelsior Rotterdam players
Belgian expatriate footballers
Expatriate footballers in England
Belgian expatriate sportspeople in England
Expatriate footballers in the Netherlands
Belgian expatriate sportspeople in the Netherlands